Galium mexicanum (Mexican bedstraw) is a species of plant in the family Rubiaceae. It has a widespread distribution from British Columbia south to Ecuador.

Subspecies
Four subspecies are currently recognized (May 2014):

Galium mexicanum subsp. asperrimum (A.Gray) Dempster - from Washington state to northern Mexico
Galium mexicanum subsp. asperulum (A.Gray) Dempster - British Columbia, Montana, Washington, Oregon, California, Nevada
Galium mexicanum subsp. flexicum Dempster - Texas and Coahuila
Galium mexicanum subsp. mexicanum - from Texas to Ecuador

References

External links
Photo of herbarium specimen from University of Texas, collected in Oaxaca, Galium mexicanum 
Photo of herbarium specimen at Missouri Botanical Garden, collected in Veracruz, Galium mexicanum 
USDA plants profile, Galium mexicanum subsp. asperulum
Especies de Costa Rica

mexicanum
Flora of Mexico
Flora of Washington (state)
Flora of California
Flora of Oregon
Flora of Nevada
Flora of Idaho
Flora of Montana
Flora of Utah
Flora of New Mexico
Flora of Colorado
Flora of Texas
Flora of Central America
Flora of Colombia
Flora of Venezuela
Flora of Ecuador
Flora of British Columbia
Plants described in 1818
Flora without expected TNC conservation status